Pavlikovo is a rural locality (a village) in Staroselskoye Rural Settlement, Vologodsky District, Vologda Oblast, Russia. The population was 2 as of 2002.

Geography 
Pavlikovo is located 59 km west of Vologda (the district's administrative centre) by road. Kipelovo is the nearest locality.

References 

Rural localities in Vologodsky District